Bergslagen is a historical, cultural, and linguistic region located north of Lake Mälaren in northern Svealand, Sweden, traditionally known as a mining district. In Bergslagen, the mining and metallurgic industries have been important since the Middle Ages although Malmfälten ("the Ore Fields"), the mining district of northernmost Sweden centred at the towns of Kiruna and Malmberget, has been of greater importance during the 20th century.

Bergslagen is not precisely defined, but generally understood to cover part of the provinces of Västmanland, Dalarna (the southern part), and Värmland (the eastern part). Typical towns in the area include Lindesberg, Nora, Fagersta, Sala, Kristinehamn, Filipstad, Grythyttan, Ludvika and Hedemora. Also parts of northern Östergötland, around Finspång, as well as southern Närke can be included, then often referring to South Bergslagen. A wider definition of the area can include parts of Gästrikland (Hofors) and Uppland (the former iron manufacturing district centred on Dannemora) as well.

History 
The conflict of interests between iron exports from Bergslagen and territorial conflicts at Denmark's southern border was a chief reason behind the Engelbrekt rebellion in 1434 and the following strifes that ultimately resulted in the dissolution of the Kalmar Union in 1523.

The region was an industrial powerhouse from the 17th century, up to the Steel crisis during the 1970s.

Minerals and mining 

The area is very rich in minerals. Mining has been focused on iron ore for centuries but other ores have been mined as well. Most mines are now closed, but in the 1970s many mines were still in operation. The earliest signs of iron making date back to 400 BC while industrial scale activities date back to the 17th century.

At Långban, where iron and manganese have been mined, 270 mineral species have been reported to date. Many of these minerals are unique to the Långban deposit, and 67 minerals were first found at this site.

See also
 Ecomuseum Bergslagen
 Falu red
 Roslagen
 Mälaren Valley

References

External links 
Ecomuseum Bergslagen - Official site
Långban and its minerals

 
Mining in Sweden
Metallogenetic provinces